Maynard Ferguson is a 1971 big band jazz album by Canadian jazz trumpeter Maynard Ferguson. The album was originally released on Columbia Records as Columbia 31117. It was also released in the UK by CBS under the name Alive & Well in London. The album largely consists of arrangements of popular songs of the period along with one original composition.

While he merely "dipped his toes" in the waters of pop music for his first Columbia release (M.F. Horn – Eli's Comin', MacArthur Park), on this album Maynard dives right in. While some albums would contain more "true" jazz than others, this would set the template for most of his tenure at Columbia. Mostly pop covers or popular jazz, with an occasional original (The Serpent on this release) or jazz standard (such as Airegin on 1977's New Vintage).

Reissues
Maynard Ferguson was reissued on CD in 2005 on Wounded Bird 1117.

Track listing

Personnel
 Keith Mansfield: Producer
 Mike Smith: Executive producer

References

1971 albums
Big band albums
Columbia Records albums
Maynard Ferguson albums